USS Defiance (AMc-73) was an Accentor-class coastal minesweeper acquired by the U.S. Navy for the dangerous task of removing mines from minefields laid in the water to prevent ships from passing.

World War II service 

Defiance was launched in June 1941 and was placed "in service", during 1941-45 and attached to the 10th Naval District.

Post-war inactivation 

She was struck in 1946.

References

External links 
 

 

Accentor-class minesweepers
World War II mine warfare vessels of the United States
1941 ships